Presidential elections were held in Colombia on 4 May 1958. They were the first presidential elections since 1949, following a military coup against President Laureano Gómez in 1953. Following the coup, the two main parties (the Conservative Party and the Liberal Party) came to an agreement on holding office for alternating periods of four years. The agreement, known as the National Front, was approved in a 1957 referendum.

The election resulted in a victory for Alberto Lleras Camargo of the Liberal Party (and also supported by the Colombian Communist Party), who received 80% of the vote. Although the Conservatives had agreed to let the Liberal Party hold power during the 1958–1962 period, dissidents in the Conservative Party put forward Jorge Leyva as a candidate.

Results

References

Presidential elections in Colombia
1958 in Colombia
Colombia
Election and referendum articles with incomplete results